Micronaspis is a genus of fireflies in the family of beetles known as Lampyridae, containing only one species, the Florida intertidal firefly (Micronaspis floridana). It is found in the Bahamas and Florida. It is threatened by habitat loss from coastal development as well as storm surges and sea level rise as a consequence of climate change, with Hurricane Dorian having a major impact on Grand Bahama island, where the species is known from. Increased chemical and light pollution has also seriously affected the species. Further threatening it in Florida is the introduction of Steinernema carpocapsae as a biocontrol agent for crops, which is known to target other beetle species than the ones it is meant to control; it is likely the cause of a local extirpation of a population of M. floridana from Sarasota Bay.

References

Further reading

 
 
 
 
 
 
 
 

Lampyridae genera
Lampyridae
Monotypic Elateriformia genera
Bioluminescent insects